This is a list of active French Navy ships. The French Navy consists of nearly 100 vessels of the Force d'action navale (Naval action force) and the 9 submarines of the Forces sous-marines (Submarine force). Primary assets include 1 nuclear aircraft carrier, 3 amphibious assault ships, 4 air-defence-focused destroyers, 6 anti-submarine (ASW)/land attack mission-oriented destroyers, 5 general-purpose frigates, and 6 surveillance frigates. The submarine force consists of 5 nuclear attack submarines and 4 nuclear ballistic missile submarines. Integral to supporting the Force d'Action Navale at sea are the French Navy's 2 replenishment oilers, 16 mine countermeasure vessels and 8 support ships. In addition to the above units, the Navy operates 15 patrol ships (supplemented by additional coast guard/Maritime Gendarmerie vessels), 5 survey vessels, 4 experimentation ships, 4 ocean tugboats and 14 training vessels.

The French Navy does not use the term "destroyer" in vessel names. Instead, surface combatants of the first rank (such as the Aquitaine class) are named "frigates", though they are registered as destroyers (with hull numbers "Dxxx").

Submarine fleet (Forces sous-marines)

Ballistic missile submarines

Nuclear attack submarines

Surface fleet (Bâtiments de combat)

Aircraft carrier

Amphibious warfare

Major surface combatants

Patrol

Mine countermeasures

Coastguard
See also: Maritime Gendarmerie

Auxiliary fleet (Bâtiments de soutien)

Replenishment

Intelligence, research and experimentation

Survey

Ocean tugboats

Port and coastal tugboats

Support

Training

For a complete list of Bâtiments de soutien (Auxiliaries) see Bâtiments de soutien at the official Marine Nationale website.

Silhouettes
Silhouettes of major fleet units:

See also
Future of the French Navy
Maritime Gendarmerie
List of active French Navy landing craft
List of ships of the line of France
List of battleships of France
List of French cruisers
List of destroyers of France
List of French sail frigates
List of French steam frigates

References

External links
  French Navy - Guide Book 2011
  French Navy - Facts & Figures 2011
  Marine Nationale - List of ships 
  Marine Nationale - Blogs for individual ships
  Net Marine
  Alabordache

 
France
 Active